The Jade (in its upper course: Geestrandtief) is a  long river in Lower Saxony, northwestern Germany. Rising near Oldenburg, it flows into the Jade Bight, a bay of the North Sea, near Varel.

Literature 
 Klaus Dede: An der Jade (1978) (in German)

See also 
 Jade Bight
 List of rivers of Lower Saxony

References

Rivers of Lower Saxony
0Jade
Rivers of Germany